Cristopher Javier Varela Caicedo (born 27 November 1999) is a Venezuelan footballer who plays as a goalkeeper for Atletico Bucaramanga.

Career statistics

Club

Notes

References

1999 births
Living people
Venezuelan footballers
Association football goalkeepers
Venezuelan Primera División players
Deportivo Táchira F.C. players
People from San Cristóbal, Táchira